Everyday Life may refer to:

 Everyday life, the concept of routinely habits people perform
 Everyday Life (Coldplay album), 2019
 "Everyday Life" (song), from the album of the same name
 Everyday Life (Life album), 2003
 Every Day Life, a rapcore band